Groscavallo is a comune (municipality) in the Metropolitan City of Turin in the Italian region Piedmont, located in one of the Valli di Lanzo about  northwest of Turin, on the border with France.   The Levanne massif is located nearby.

The communal seat is in the frazione of Pialpetta. Groscavallo borders the following municipalities: Ala di Stura, Balme, Bonneval-sur-Arc (France), Ceres, Ceresole Reale, Chialamberto, and Noasca.

References